The second HMS Narborough (K578) was a British Captain-class frigate of the Royal Navy in commission during World War II. Originally constructed as a United States Navy Buckley class destroyer escort, she served in the Royal Navy from 1944 to 1946.

Construction and transfer
The ship was laid down as the unnamed U.S. Navy destroyer escort DE-569 by Bethlehem-Hingham Shipyard, Inc., in Hingham, Massachusetts, on 6 October 1943 and launched on 27 November 1943. She was transferred to the United Kingdom upon completion on 21 January 1944.

Service history

Commissioned into service in the Royal Navy as the frigate HMS Narborough (K578) on 21 January 1944 simultaneously with her transfer, the ship served on patrol and escort duty for the remainder of World War II.

The Royal Navy returned Narborough to the U.S. Navy on 4 February 1946.

Disposal
Narborough was sold on 14 December 1946 for scrapping.

References
Navsource Online: Destroyer Escort Photo Archive Narbrough (DE-569) HMS Narbrough (K-578)
uboat.net HMS Narbrough (K 578)
Destroyer Escort Sailors Association DEs for UK
Captain Class Frigate Association HMS Narborough K578 (DE 569)

External links
Photo gallery of HMS Narborough (K578)

 

Captain-class frigates
Buckley-class destroyer escorts
World War II frigates of the United Kingdom
Ships built in Hingham, Massachusetts
1943 ships